John Cadwalader (January 10, 1742 – February 10, 1786) was a commander of Pennsylvania troops during the American Revolutionary War and served under George Washington. He was with Washington at Valley Forge.

Early life
John Cadwalader was born in Trenton, New Jersey of Quaker parentage, the eldest son of Thomas Cadwalader (1707–1779) and Hannah Lambert, his wife. In 1750, the Cadwalader family removed to Philadelphia where John and Lambert Cadwalader, his brother, were merchants.

In 1768 he was elected to the American Philosophical Society. On September 25, 1768, John Cadwalader married Elizabeth Lloyd (1742–1776), the daughter of Edward Lloyd, of Talbot County, Maryland. Her brother, Edward Lloyd IV, was a delegate to the Continental Congress for Maryland. Their daughter, Maria Cadwalader (1776–1811), married Samuel Ringgold, who became a congressman representing Maryland. Two of their sons, Samuel Ringgold and Cadwalader Ringgold, had distinguished military careers.

Revolutionary War

In 1776, Colonel John Cadwalader was elected senior officer of the Philadelphia Associators, a volunteer militia founded by Benjamin Franklin in 1747. By December, Cadwalader and the Associators were positioned about 10 miles south of Trenton on the west side of the Delaware River in Bucks County, Pennsylvania at the ferry between Bristol, Pennsylvania and Burlington, New Jersey. Cadwalader had received orders to send his column across the river on the night of December 25–26 and march to Trenton from the south. Meanwhile, George Washington's column would cross the river to the north of Trenton and attack the city from that direction. After successfully crossing his light forces, Cadwalader discovered that river ice prevented crossing his artillery. He then returned his column to the Pennsylvania side, leaving Washington's forces unsupported in New Jersey. It was fortunate for Washington that a Hessian column, having marched from their garrison at Bordentown to Mount Holly where they were engaged in the Battle of Iron Works Hill, were no longer in position to defend Trenton. Washington was successful in his surprise attack on the morning of December 26 against the Hessian garrison in Trenton.

Cadwalader and his column did cross the river the next day. Cadwalader subsequently took part in the further actions in New Jersey, which forced the British commander General William Howe and his principal subordinate, Lord Cornwallis, to surrender the colony to the Americans.
 
After the Conway Cabal, he fought a duel with Thomas Conway in 1778 in which Cadwalader wounded his opponent with a shot in the mouth. Supposedly Cadawalader, a supporter of Washington throughout the cabal, boasted, "I have stopped that damned rascal's lying anyway" as he stood over the bleeding Conway.

Post-war

In 1779, Cadwalader became a trustee of the University of Pennsylvania and returned to his estate on the banks of the Sassafras River at Shrewsbury, Kent County, Maryland. He became a member of the Maryland State Assembly.

Personal life

John Cadwalader married Williamina Bond (1753–1837), daughter of Dr. Phineas Bond, of Philadelphia and niece of Thomas Bond.  Their son, Thomas (1779–1841), like his father, became a general of the Pennsylvania militia. Their daughter, Frances (1781–1843), married David Erskine, 2nd Baron Erskine (1777–1855), who was the British Ambassador to the United States from 1807 to 1809.

John Cadwalader died February 10, 1786, of pneumonia. He is buried at Shrewsbury Chapel, Kent County, Maryland. 

Thomas Paine wrote his epitaph:

His early and inflexible patriotism will endear his memory to all true friends of the American Revolution. It may with strictest justice be said of him, that he possessed a heart  incapable of deceiving. His manners were formed on the nicest sense of honor and the whole tenor of his life was governed by this principle. The companions of his youth were the companions of his manhood. He never lost a friend by insincerity nor made one by deception. His domestic virtues were truly exemplary and while they served to endear the remembrances they embitter the loss of him to all his numerous friends and connections.

Furniture
John and Elizabeth Cadwalader built a city house on 2nd between Spruce & Union (now Delancey) Streets in Philadelphia in 1770, and they commissioned suites of furniture from cabinetmakers such as Thomas Affleck and Benjamin Randolph. Surviving pieces are among the finest and best-documented Philadelphia Chippendale furniture ever made. Colonial Grandeur in Philadelphia: The House and Furniture of General John Cadwalader (The Historical Society of Pennsylvania, 1964) Examples are in the Metropolitan Museum of Art, the Philadelphia Museum of Art, the Winterthur Museum, and other collections. A Cadwalader easy (wing) chair with hairy-paw feet by Affleck sold at Sotheby's New York for $2.75 million on January 31, 1987, setting a world record for the highest price ever paid for any piece of furniture at auction.

Family tree

Notes

References
 Historical Society of Pennsylvania: Biography of John Cadwalader
 Fischer, David Hackett (2004). Washington's Crossing. New York: Oxford University Press. 
 Jordan, John W. (1914). Encyclopedia of Pennsylvania biography. New York: Lewis Historical Pub. Co., 111: 720-723. John Cadwalader family history
 Kent County Heritage Committee (2003). Guide to Kent County heritage. Chestertown, Maryland.
 Rodgers Biographical Dictionary. "General John Cadwallader ". pp. 224–228.
 Weeks, Christopher, et al. (1984). Where land and water intertwine, an architectural history of Talbot County, Maryland. Baltimore: The Johns Hopkins University Press, 
The Ipswich Journal Ipswich, Suffolk, England Saturday, January 11, 1777

External links
 Biography and portrait of Gen. John Cadwalader at Virtualology.com
 
 
 Biography and portrait of Gen. John Cadwalader Courtesy of the University of Pennsylvania
 Biography and portrait of Dr. Thomas Cadwalader Courtesy of the University of Pennsylvania
 The Cadwalader Family Papers, including correspondence and Revolutionary War materials belonging to General John Cadwalader, are available for research use at the Historical Society of Pennsylvania.

1742 births
1786 deaths
People from Trenton, New Jersey
American people of Welsh descent
American duellists
Militia generals in the American Revolution
Pennsylvania militiamen in the American Revolution
People from Kent County, Maryland
Members of the American Philosophical Society
Burials in Maryland
Continental Army officers from New Jersey
University of Pennsylvania people
People of colonial New Jersey